This page lists the films composed by Ilaiyaraaja in the 1980s.

Ilaiyaraaja 1980

Ilaiyaraaja 1981

Ilaiyaraaja 1982

Ilaiyaraaja 1983

Ilaiyaraaja 1984

Ilaiyaraaja 1985

Ilaiyaraaja 1986

Ilaiyaraaja 1987

Ilaiyaraaja 1988

Ilaiyaraaja 1989

Decade-wise Statistics

References

External links
 
 Raaja.com: The official Internet website of Ilaiyaraaja
 Collection of Ilayaraja songs at Paadal.com
 Collection of Ilayaraja Songs, Videos, Images and BGM

Indian songs
Discographies
Discographies of Indian artists